Caenorhabditis portoensis is a species of nematode in the genus Caenorhabditis. First wild isolate sample (strain EG4788) was found on a rotting apple in Portugal.

Prior to 2014, it was referred to as C. sp. 6. It groups with C. virilis (sp. 13) in the 'Drosophilae' supergroup in phylogenetic studies.

References

External links 
 Caenorhabditis portoensis at the Caenorhabditis Genetics Center, University of Minnesota

portoensis
Nematodes described in 2014
Fauna of Portugal